Leeuwarden Camminghaburen is a suburb railway station in Leeuwarden, Netherlands. The station opened on 2 June 1991 and is located on the Harlingen–Nieuweschans railway between Leeuwarden and Groningen. Train services are operated by Arriva.

Train services

Bus services

Regular city bus service serves the neighborhood of Camminghaburen, but not the station.

See also
 List of railway stations in Friesland

External links
NS website 
Dutch Public Transport journey planner 

Railway stations in Leeuwarden
Railway stations opened in 1991
Railway stations on the Staatslijn B
1991 establishments in the Netherlands
Railway stations in the Netherlands opened in the 20th century